Jan de Vries,  (24 January 1924 – 27 May 2012) was a Dutch-born Canadian World War II paratrooper and veteran's advocate. His work as a board member of the Juno Beach Centre contributed to its creation.

Military service
de Vries served with the 1st Canadian Parachute Battalion, parachuting into Normandy on D-Day and later parachuting across the Rhine River into Germany on March 24, 1945. He was wounded in action by a German sniper in July 1944, however  had returned to combat by September, 1944.

Philanthropy
de Vries was a member of the Royal Canadian Legion for 40 years. He served as a President of the 1st Canadian Parachute Battalion Association for 12 years.  Under his leadership, the Association installed memorial plaques in Europe to commemorate their fallen comrades.

Additionally, de Vries served on the Advisory Board of the Canadian Airborne Forces Museum as well as on the Board of the Canadian Airborne Forces Association. His efforts contributed to the successful opening of the Juno Beach Centre.  As a founding member of the Living History Speakers Bureau and a member of the Dominion Institute Memory Project, de Vries also regularly spoke to school children and cadet groups, including the Cadet Basic Parachutist Course, regarding Canadian contributions during World War II.

de Vries was also Honorary Chairman of the Corporal Fred Topham Victoria Cross fundraising project, which resulted in all of Topham's medals being displayed at the Canadian War Museum, including his Victoria Cross. He was a Patron of the Victoria Cross Trust and a memorial page can be found on their website.

Honours
In June 2004, de Vries was named a Chevalier of the French Legion of Honour by President Jacques Chirac. He was named to the Order of Canada in 2007. In 2010 he was selected as an Olympic torchbearer as part of the 2010 Olympic Games.

de Vries died in 2012 at Rouge Valley Ajax and Pickering hospital.

References

1924 births
2012 deaths
People from Leeuwarden
Canadian Army personnel of World War II
Chevaliers of the Légion d'honneur
Members of the Order of Canada
Dutch emigrants to Canada
Canadian Army soldiers
Burials in Ontario